William Harris Crawford (February 24, 1772 – September 15, 1834) was an American politician and judge during the early 19th century. He served as US Secretary of War and US Secretary of the Treasury before he ran for US president in the 1824 election.

Born in Virginia, Crawford moved to Georgia at a young age. After studying law, Crawford won election to the Georgia House of Representatives in 1803. He aligned with the Democratic-Republican Party and US Senator James Jackson. In 1807, the Georgia legislature elected Crawford to the US Senate. After the death of US Vice President George Clinton, Crawford's position as president pro tempore of the US Senate made him first in the presidential line of succession from April 1812 to March 1813. In 1813, US President James Madison appointed Crawford as the minister to France, and Crawford held that post for the remainder of the War of 1812. After the war, Madison appointed him to the position of Secretary of War. In October 1816, Madison chose Crawford for the position of Secretary of the Treasury, and Crawford would remain in that office for the remainder of Madison's presidency and for the duration of James Monroe's presidency.

Although Crawford suffered a severe stroke in 1823, he sought to succeed Monroe at the 1824 election. Crawford received the support of the Virginia dynasty, but ongoing concerns about his health along with a changing political landscape made it impossible for him to become the fourth consecutive Virginian to hold the office of president. The Democratic-Republican Party splintered into factions, as several others also sought the presidency. No candidate won a majority of the electoral vote and so the US House of Representatives chose the president in a contingent election. Under the terms of the US Constitution, the House selected from the three candidates who received the most electoral votes, which left Andrew Jackson, John Quincy Adams, and Crawford in the running. The House selected Adams, who asked Crawford to remain as Treasury Secretary. Declining Adams's offer, Crawford returned to Georgia and accepted an appointment to the state superior court.

Crawford considered running in the 1832 presidential election for the presidency or the vice presidency but ultimately chose not to when fellow southerner Andrew Jackson sought a second term.

Early life
Crawford was born on February 24, 1772, in the portion of Amherst County, Virginia, that later became Nelson County, the son of Joel Crawford and Fanny Harris, but at least one source has given his birthplace as Tusculum, a house whose site remains in Amherst County. He moved with his family to Edgefield County, South Carolina, in 1779 and to Columbia County, Georgia, in 1783. Crawford was educated at private schools in Georgia and at Richmond Academy in Augusta. After his father's death, Crawford became the family's main financial provider, and he worked on the Crawford family farm and taught school. He later studied law, was admitted to the bar in 1799 and began to practice in Lexington. Also in 1799, Crawford was appointed by the state legislature to prepare a digest of Georgia's statutes.

State politics
He influenced Georgia politics for decades. In 1803, Crawford was elected to the Georgia House of Representatives as a member of the Democratic-Republican Party, and he served until 1807. He allied himself with Senator James Jackson. Their enemies were the Clarkites, led by John Clark. In 1802, he shot and killed Peter Lawrence Van Alen, a Clark ally, in a duel. Four years later, on December 16, 1806, Crawford faced Clark himself in a duel, and Crawford's left wrist was shattered by a shot from Clark, but he eventually recovered.

U.S. Senate
In 1807, Crawford joined the 10th Congress as the junior U.S. senator from Georgia when the Georgia legislature elected him to replace George Jones, who had held the office for a few months after the death of Abraham Baldwin.

Crawford was elected President pro tempore of the Senate in March 1812 and, following the April 20, 1812, death of Vice President George Clinton, served as the permanent Presiding Officer of the Senate until March 4, 1813.

In 1811, Crawford declined to serve as Secretary of War in the Madison administration. In the Senate, he voted for several acts leading up to the War of 1812 and supported the entry into the war, but he was ready for peace: "Let it then be the wisdom of this nation to remain at peace, as long as peace is within its option."

Throughout his service in the Senate, Crawford was described as a member of the older more traditional wing of the Democratic-Republican Party, and he often focused on issues such as states' rights, which he supported.

Minister to France
In 1813, President James Madison appointed Crawford as the US minister to France during the waning years of Napoleon's First French Empire. Crawford served until 1815, shortly after the end of the Napoleonic Wars.

Cabinet
Upon Crawford's return, Madison appointed him as Secretary of War on 1 August 1815. Crawford served more than a year in that post. He sought but narrowly failed to win the Democratic-Republican nomination for the 1816 presidential race. Madison appointed him Treasury Secretary on 22 October 1816. He remained in that post for the rest of Madison's term and both terms of President James Monroe, until 6 March 1825.

1824 election
The Congressional Caucus nominated Crawford for the 1824 election. However, Crawford had suffered a stroke in 1823 as a result of a prescription given to him by his physician. The Democratic-Republican Party was now split, and one of the splinter groups nominated Crawford.  Despite improved health and the support of former Presidents Madison and Thomas Jefferson, he finished third in the electoral vote, behind Senator and General Andrew Jackson, hero of the Battle of New Orleans, and Secretary of State John Quincy Adams.  In the subsequent contingent election, the House elected Adams President.

Later life
Refusing Adams's request for him to remain at the Treasury, Crawford then returned to Georgia, where he was appointed as a state superior court judge. Crawford remained an active judge until his death, a decade later.

Crawford was nominated for vice president by the Georgia legislature in 1828 but withdrew after support from other states was not forthcoming. Crawford also considered running for vice president in 1832 but decided against it, in favor of Martin Van Buren. Crawford also considered running for president again in 1832 but dropped the idea when Jackson decided to seek a second term.

Crawford is buried at the site of his home, about half a mile west of the current Crawford city limit.

Societies
During the 1820s, Crawford was a member of the prestigious society Columbian Institute for the Promotion of Arts and Sciences, which had among its members former Presidents Andrew Jackson and John Quincy Adams.

Crawford also served as a Vice President in the American Colonization Society from its formation in 1817 to his death.

Family
Crawford was a descendant of John Crawford (1600–1676), who had come to Virginia in 1643 but participated and died in Bacon's Rebellion. John's son David Crawford I (1625–1698), was the father of David Crawford II (1662–1762), and the grandfather of David Crawford III (1697–1766). David Crawford III married Ann Anderson in 1727 and had 13 children, including Joel Crawford (1736–1788).

His cousin George W. Crawford served as Secretary of War under President Zachary Taylor.

Legacy

In 1875, Crawford appeared on the 50 cent bill.

The following places are named in his honor:

Cities and towns
 Crawford, Georgia
 Crawfordville, Georgia
 Crawfordsville, Indiana

Counties
 Crawford County, Arkansas
 Crawford County, Georgia
 Crawford County, Illinois
 Crawford County, Indiana
 Crawford County, Iowa
 Crawford County, Michigan
 Crawford County, Missouri
 Crawford County, Wisconsin

Squares
Crawford Square, Savannah, Georgia

References

Further reading
 
 Garraty, John A. and Mark C. Carnes. American National Biography, vol. 5, "Crawford, William Harris". New York : Oxford University Press, 1999.
 
 
 
 
 
 
 
 
 
 </ref>

External links
 William Harris Crawford papers(Woodson Research Center, Fondren Library, Rice University, Houston, TX, USA)

 William Harris Crawford Collection from the Georgia Historical Society
 Troup-Clarke Political Feud historical marker

|-

|-

|-

|-

|-

|-

1772 births
1834 deaths
19th-century American diplomats
19th-century American politicians
Ambassadors of the United States to France
Democratic-Republican Party United States senators
American duellists
Georgia (U.S. state) Democratic-Republicans
Georgia (U.S. state) state court judges
Madison administration cabinet members
Members of the Georgia House of Representatives
Monroe administration cabinet members
People from Nelson County, Virginia
People from Lexington, Georgia
Presidents pro tempore of the United States Senate
Candidates in the 1824 United States presidential election
United States Secretaries of the Treasury
United States Secretaries of War
United States senators from Georgia (U.S. state)
American colonization movement